West Midlands is a metropolitan county in the West Midlands Region, England, with a 2021 population of 2,919,600, making it the second most populous county in England after Greater London. It was created in 1974 by the Local Government Act 1972, from parts of Staffordshire, Worcestershire and Warwickshire. The county is a NUTS 2 region within the wider NUTS 1 region of the same name. It embraces seven metropolitan boroughs: the cities of Birmingham, Coventry and Wolverhampton, and the boroughs of Dudley, Sandwell, Solihull and Walsall. The county is overseen by the West Midlands Combined Authority, which covers all seven boroughs and other non-constituent councils, on economy, transport and housing.

Status
The metropolitan county exists in law, as a geographical frame of reference, and as a ceremonial county. As such it has a Lord Lieutenant. and a High Sheriff. Between 1974 and 1986, the West Midlands County Council was the administrative body covering the county; this was abolished on 31 March 1986, and the constituent metropolitan boroughs effectively became unitary authorities. A new administrative body for the county (and some of the district surrounding it as Non-Constituent members), the West Midlands Combined Authority, was created in June 2016. Since May 2017, the authority has been headed by a directly elected Mayor of the West Midlands, a position currently held by Andy Street of the Conservative Party. Other county-wide bodies include the West Midlands Police, the West Midlands Fire Service and Transport for West Midlands.

The county is sometimes described as the "West Midlands metropolitan area" or the "West Midlands conurbation" or "Greater Birmingham", although these have different, less clearly defined, boundaries. The main conurbation or urban area does not include Coventry, for example. The name "West Midlands" is also used for the much larger West Midlands region, which sometimes causes confusion. Geographically the county is on the eastern side of the region, the western side comprising Shropshire and Herefordshire and the southern side comprising Worcestershire and Warwickshire.

History
 

Although the modern county has only existed since 1974, the settlements of the West Midlands have long been important centres of commerce and industry as well as developing a good local infrastructure. Coventry was one of England's most important cities during the Middle Ages, with its prosperity built upon wool and cloth manufacture. Birmingham and Wolverhampton have a tradition of industry dating back to the 16th century, when small metal-working industries developed. Birmingham was known for its manufacture of small arms, whereas Wolverhampton became a centre of lock manufacture and brass working. The coal and iron ore deposits of the Black Country area provided a ready source of raw materials. The area grew rapidly during the Industrial Revolution, and by the 20th century had grown into one large conurbation. Coventry was slower to develop, but by the early 20th century it had become an important centre of bicycle and car manufacture.

1966 saw a substantial reform in the local government of the area as the patchwork of county boroughs with municipal boroughs and urban district councils in between was replaced by a core of county boroughs covering a contiguous area, roughly as follows:
Birmingham, which remained substantially unaltered
Dudley, which absorbed all Brierley Hill, most of Coseley and Sedgley, and part of Amblecote, Tipton and Rowley Regis
Solihull, which remained substantially unaltered
Walsall, which absorbed all Darlaston, most of Willenhall, and parts of Wednesbury, Coseley, Wednesfield and Bilston
Warley, which was created by amalgamating most of Smethwick, Oldbury and Rowley Regis, and parts of Dudley, Tipton, West Bromwich and Halesowen
West Bromwich, which absorbed most of Wednesbury and Tipton, and parts of Bilston, Oldbury, Smethwick and Walsall
Wolverhampton, which absorbed most of Bilston, Wednesfield and Tettenhall, and parts of Sedgley, Coseley and Willenhall

Near the area, three other towns remained separate (Halesowen, Stourbridge and Sutton Coldfield), while Aldridge and Brownhills joined to form a single unit, called Aldridge-Brownhills. In the same year, a single West Midlands Constabulary was formed for the Black Country county boroughs, whilst Birmingham retained its Birmingham City Police and Solihull continued being policed by the Warwickshire Constabulary. The West Midlands Passenger Transport Authority was established in 1968.

County creation
In 1974, the Local Government Act 1972 came into effect, creating the metropolitan county of West Midlands. This area was based on the seven county boroughs and the other non-county boroughs and urban districts around the fringe of the conurbation.

The new area consisted of seven new metropolitan boroughs, with Aldridge-Brownhills added to Walsall; Halesowen and Stourbridge to Dudley and Sutton Coldfield to Birmingham. A new borough of Sandwell was formed by the merger of West Bromwich and Warley. The actual designation of Warley itself was abolished and the three towns of Smethwick, Oldbury and Rowley Regis reinstated as component parts of Sandwell, although these areas formed the Warley postal district. Solihull took in much of the suburban fringe to the east of Birmingham, including the former villages of Chelmsley Wood and Castle Bromwich, also Birmingham Airport, and the area of countryside between Solihull and Coventry, whilst Coventry itself received only small changes and Wolverhampton was unaltered. This led to (apart from in the east, with Coventry and the Meriden Gap) quite a tightly defined metropolitan border, excluding such places as Burntwood, Bromsgrove, Cannock, Kidderminster, Lichfield and Wombourne which had been considered for inclusion in the West Midlands metropolitan area by the Redcliffe-Maud Report. 

The 1974 reform created the West Midlands County Council that covered the entire area and dealt with strategic issues. A new West Midlands Police service was formed covering the entire area, with the West Midlands Constabulary and Birmingham City Police abolished, and also taking over responsibility from the county forces.

West Midlands was also established as a new ceremonial county, with the offices of Lord Lieutenant and High Sheriff created. Its constituent components had previously been, for ceremonial purposes, under the equivalent offices of Warwickshire (Birmingham CB, Coventry CB, Solihull CB, Sutton Coldfield MB and Meriden RD), Staffordshire (Wolverhampton CB, Walsall CB, West Bromwich CB, Dudley CB and Aldridge-Brownhills UD) and Worcestershire (Warley CB, Stourbridge MB and Halesowen MB).

West Midlands County Council

Between 1974 and 1986, the county had a two-tier system of local government, and the seven districts shared power with the West Midlands County Council. However, the Local Government Act 1985 abolished the metropolitan county councils, and the West Midlands County Council ceased to exist in 1986. Most of its functions were devolved to the West Midland boroughs, which effectively became unitary authorities, with responsibility for most local authority functions.

Following the abolition of the county council, some county-wide bodies continued to exist, which were administered by various joint-boards of the seven districts, among these were the West Midlands Police, the West Midlands Fire Service and the West Midlands Passenger Transport Executive.

Boundary changes
In 1994, the western/southern shores of Chasewater, plus the adjacent Jeffreys Swag, were transferred from the Metropolitan Borough of Walsall to the District of Lichfield, Staffordshire. Further boundary changes came into effect in 1995, when part of the Hereford and Worcester parish of Frankley (including the south-west part of Bartley Reservoir) was transferred to Birmingham and became part of the county.

West Midlands Combined Authority
On 17 June 2016, a new administrative body, the West Midlands Combined Authority was created for the county, under the Local Democracy, Economic Development and Construction Act 2009, which created several other combined authorities in England. The new body has powers over transport, economic development, skills and planning. A new directly elected position of Mayor of the West Midlands was created in 2017 to chair the new body. The first Mayoral election was held in May 2017, and the position was won by Andy Street of the Conservative Party.

Geography

The West Midlands is a landlocked county that borders the counties of Warwickshire to the east, Worcestershire to the south, and Staffordshire to the north and west.

The West Midlands County is one of the most heavily urbanised counties in the UK. Birmingham, Wolverhampton, the Black Country and Solihull together form the third most populous conurbation in the United Kingdom with a combined population of around 2.44 million. A smaller piece of green belt between Birmingham, Walsall and West Bromwich includes Barr Beacon and the Sandwell Valley.

The hill is a Site of Special Scientific Interest.

There are 23 Sites of Special Scientific Interest in the county. As a result, it is one of the largest urban parks in Europe, and the largest outside of a capital city in Europe. The park also has national nature reserve status.

There are numerous rivers that pass through the county, including the River Tame. The river basin is the most urbanised basin in the United Kingdom, with approximately 42% of the basin being urbanised. The River Tame is fed by the River Rea, River Anker, and the River Blythe, which in turn is fed by the River Cole. The River Sowe and River Sherbourne both flow through Coventry. The River Stour flows through the west of the West Midlands county.

Like other metropolitan counties, the West Midlands is divided into districts called metropolitan boroughs. There are seven boroughs in the West Midlands, six of which are named after the largest settlement in their administrative area. The West Midlands is unusual amongst the metropolitan counties in that three of its boroughs have city status; Coventry is a city by ancient prescriptive usage, Birmingham was granted city status in 1889, and Wolverhampton in 2000 as a "Millennium City".

Demography

Places of interest

Education
The West Midlands contains ten universities, seven of which are located in Birmingham:
Aston University
University of Birmingham
Birmingham City University
University College Birmingham
BPP University
University of Law
Newman University

Both of Coventry University and the University of Warwick are located in Coventry whilst University of Wolverhampton is located in Wolverhampton with campuses in Telford and Walsall.

Each of the local authorities has at least one further education college for students aged over 16, and since September 1992 all of the local authorities have operated traditional 5–7 infant, 7–11 junior, and 11-16/18 secondary schools for students in compulsory education. This followed the demise of 5–8 first, 8–12 middle and 12-16/18 secondary schools in the Sutton Coldfield area.

For 18 years before September 1990, Dudley had operated 5–8 first, 8–12 middle, and 12-16/18 secondary schools before then, while Halesowen (September 1972 until July 1982) and Aldridge-Brownhills (September 1972 until July 1986) had both operated 5–9 first, 9–13 middle and 13-16/18 secondary schools.

Many local authorities still have sixth form facilities in secondary schools, though sixth form facilities had been axed by most secondary schools in Dudley since the early 1990s (and in Halesowen in 1982) as the local authorities changed direction towards further education colleges.

All secondary state education in Dudley and Sandwell is mixed comprehensive, although there are a small number of single sex and grammar schools existing in parts of Birmingham, Solihull, Wolverhampton and Walsall.

In August 2009, Matthew Boulton College and Sutton Coldfield College merged to become Birmingham Metropolitan College, one of the largest further and higher education institutions in the country. Plans are afoot for the construction of a new campus in the Perry Barr area of Birmingham.

Sport

The West Midlands is home to numerous sports teams. In rugby union, the West Midlands is home to various clubs including Wasps RFC, Birmingham Barbarians, Sutton Coldfield RFC, Moseley Rugby Football Club, Birmingham & Solihull RFC, and Coventry RFC.

In rugby league, the Midlands Hurricanes are the only team from the county playing in the professional ranks, currently in the third tier League 1.

In association football, there are six Premier League and Football League teams in the county of which two, Aston Villa,  and Wolverhampton Wanderers, play in the Premier League. The following clubs are often referred to as the West Midlands "Big Six":

The West Midlands is also home to Warwickshire County Cricket Club, who are based at Edgbaston Cricket Ground, which also hosts Test matches and One Day Internationals. The Birmingham Panthers basketball team replaced the Birmingham Bullets and are currently based at a facility provided by the University of Wolverhampton in Walsall.

The West Midlands has its own Quidditch team, West Midlands Revolution (after its part in the Industrial Revolution), which won the Quidditch Premier League in 2017.

See also

List of ceremonial counties in England by gross value added
List of conservation areas in the West Midlands
Evolution of Worcestershire county boundaries

References

External links

Photographs of Birmingham and the West Midlands
Identity in the West Midlands
West Midlands Joint Committee
Images of West Midlands at the English Heritage Archive

West Midlands
Metropolitan counties
County
NUTS 2 statistical regions of the United Kingdom
Counties of England established in 1974